Mangakino is a small town on the banks of the Waikato River in the North Island of New Zealand. The town and its infrastructure are administered as the Mangakino Pouakani ward by the Taupō District Council.

History and culture

In 1896, (after 40 years of resistance) the British Crown acquired the Wairarapa Lakes from Ngāti Kahungunu and in 1915, gave in return land in middle North Island, land known as part of the Pouakani Block. At that time the land where Mangakino lies today was described as native bush and pumice wastelands, barren, unoccupied and unfarmed. In 1946, as the Karapiro Dam neared completion, workers were to transfer to the next dam construction site – 'Maraetai I', near Mangakino. The Crown, under the Public Works Act, reacquired a portion of the unoccupied Pouakani Block alongside the Waikato River to build a "hydroelectric station" and a temporary township, Mangakino, was established to house the hundreds of construction workers needed. The town was only ever meant to be there on a temporary basis until the completion of the proposed dams.

The city planner Ernst Plischke who emigrated from Austria in 1939 developed a plan for the town centre of Mangakino, which was put into action in 1947–1948. His plan included a pedestrian area in the town centre free from through traffic.

In 1952 the population exceeded 5,000. Mangakino also serviced the construction of Ātiamuri and Ohakuri hydro schemes further upstream which were commissioned in 1959 and 1961 respectively. Mangakino and to a lesser extent Whakamaru and Ātiamuri, owe their existence to the hydro schemes and the roads constructed gave access which allowed development of the land for farming in the 1960s. The decline for Mangakino occurred after the hydro dams were commissioned and over time communities such as Maraetai and Waipapa disappeared altogether.

In 2001, the Mangakino Township Incorporation obtained approval through the Māori Land Court to legally change the title of the majority of residential sections in Mangakino from Māori land to General title. They then put Mangakino’s 500+ leasehold sections on the market as a single purchase. In July 2002, the majority of the town’s sections were sold to MV Properties of Pukekohe. A stipulation of the tender was that residents would be given the first opportunity to purchase their perpetually leased sections. The land valuations that had been exceedingly low for decades, then skyrocketed. Some locals chose to freehold their homes immediately, empty sections without current leases were sold on the open market. Many residents continue to remain perpetual leaseholders.

Marae

Pouākani Marae and its meeting house, Tamatea Pokai Whenua, is a meeting place for Ngāti Kahungunu ki Wairarapa. The marae was first built in 1972 on land exchanged for Lake Wairarapa for Ngāti Kahungunu ki Wairarapa members and other Māori who were working on the dam. The marae was destroyed by arson in 2007 but reopened in 2012 after five years of reconstruction.

In October 2020, the Government committed $4,525,105 from the Provincial Growth Fund to upgrade Pouākani Marae and 9 other marae, creating 35 jobs.

Miringa te Kakara Marae and Te Whetū Marama o Ngā Tau o Hinawa meeting house are a meeting place of Ngāti Maniapoto and Rereahu.

Demographics
The settlement is part of the larger Marotiri statistical area.

Mangakino had a population of 828 at the 2018 New Zealand census, an increase of 84 people (11.3%) since the 2013 census, and a decrease of 192 people (−18.8%) since the 2006 census. There were 321 households, comprising 414 males and 423 females, giving a sex ratio of 0.98 males per female, with 162 people (19.6%) aged under 15 years, 126 (15.2%) aged 15 to 29, 372 (44.9%) aged 30 to 64, and 174 (21.0%) aged 65 or older.

Ethnicities were 55.8% European/Pākehā, 58.3% Māori, 2.9% Pacific peoples, 4.0% Asian, and 1.8% other ethnicities. People may identify with more than one ethnicity.

Although some people chose not to answer the census's question about religious affiliation, 54.7% had no religion, 26.8% were Christian, 12.3% had Māori religious beliefs, 1.1% were Hindu,and 0.4% were Muslim.

Of those at least 15 years old, 54 (8.1%) people had a bachelor's or higher degree, and 222 (33.3%) people had no formal qualifications. 33 people (5.0%) earned over $70,000 compared to 17.2% nationally. The employment status of those at least 15 was that 204 (30.6%) people were employed full-time, 114 (17.1%) were part-time, and 57 (8.6%) were unemployed.

Education

Notable residents
Prominent former citizens of Mangakino include:
Willie Apiata VC, who was born there in 1972 
Mike Rann, Australian Ambassador and former Labor Premier of South Australia
Ron Rangi, former All Black  
Sir Basil Arthur, former Minister of Transport, Labour Government.
Hori Ahipene, actor
Annabel Langbein, celebrity cook and food writer, born there in 1958
Jimmy Hunter, former New Zealand football international. New Zealand team captain in 1954 while playing for Mangakino United.

References

External links
Mangakino Official Visitor Information Site
Mangakino, Lakeside Village
NZ Historic Places Trust Mangakino feature 2002

Populated places in Waikato
Taupō District
Pouākani
Populated places on the Waikato River